The India women's national under-20 volleyball team represents India in women's under-20 volleyball events. It is controlled and managed by the Volleyball Federation of India (VFI) that is a member of Asian volleyball body Asian Volleyball Confederation (AVC) and the international volleyball body government the Fédération Internationale de Volleyball (FIVB).

Competition history

World Championship
 1977 – Did not qualify
 1981 – 11th
 1985 – Did not enter
 1987 – Did not qualify
 1989 – Did not qualify
 1991 – Did not qualify
 1993 – Did not qualify
 1995 – Did not enter
 1997 – Did not qualify
 1999 – Did not enter
 2001 – Did not enter
 2003 – Did not qualify
 2005 – Did not qualify
 2007 – Did not qualify
 2009 – Did not qualify
 2011 – Did not qualify
 2013 – Did not qualify
 2015 – Did not qualify
 2017 – Did not qualify
 2019 – Did not qualify
  2021 – Did not qualify

Asian Championship
 1980 –  Bronze medal
 1984 – Did not enter
 1986 – 6th
 1988 – 8th
 1990 – 9th
 1992 – 8th
 1994 – Did not enter
 1996 – 6th
 1998 – Did not enter
 2000 – Did not enter
 2002 – 8th
 2004 – 7th
 2006 – 10th
 2008 – 10th
 2010 – 10th
 2012 – 6th
 2014 – 6th
 2016 – 8th
 2018 – 11th
 2022 – 7th

External links
Official website

References

volleyball
Women's volleyball in India
National women's under-20 volleyball teams
Volleyball